The seventh season of the American television series Bones premiered on November 3, 2011, and concluded on May 14, 2012, on Fox. The show maintained its previous time slot, airing on Thursdays at 9:00 pm ET for the first half of the season. It began airing on Mondays at 8:00 pm when it returned on April 2, 2012. The season contains a reduced order of 13 episodes to accommodate Emily Deschanel's pregnancy. Fox ordered an additional four episodes, that were produced during the seventh season, but aired during the first part of season eight.

Cast and characters

Main cast 
Emily Deschanel as Dr. Temperance "Bones" Brennan, a forensic anthropologist
David Boreanaz as FBI Special Agent Seeley Booth, who is the official FBI liaison with the Jeffersonian
Michaela Conlin as Angela Montenegro, a forensic artist and wife of Jack Hodgins
Tamara Taylor as Dr. Camille Saroyan, a forensic pathologist and the head of the forensic division
T. J. Thyne as Dr. Jack Hodgins, an entomologist and husband of Angela Montenegro
John Francis Daley as Dr. Lance Sweets, an FBI psychologist, who provides psychological reports on criminals and staff including Brennan and Booth

Recurring cast 
Patricia Belcher as Caroline Julian, a District attorney prosecutor that often works with the team
Andrew Leeds as Christopher Pelant, this season's recurring 'tech-savvy' antagonist
Tina Majorino as Special Agent Genevieve Shaw
Ryan O'Neal as Max Keenan, Brennan's father
Reed Diamond as Hayes Flynn, an FBI special agent
Billy Gibbons as Angela's father
Tiffany Hines as Michelle Welton, Cam's adopted daughter
Ty Panitz as Parker Booth, Booth's son
Ralph Waite as Hank Booth, Seeley's grandfather

Interns
Carla Gallo as Daisy Wick
Michael Grant Terry as Wendell Bray
Eugene Byrd as Dr. Clark Edison
Luke Kleintank as Finn Abernathy
Joel David Moore as Colin Fisher
Pej Vahdat as Arastoo Vaziri

Episodes 
The season is truncated due to Emily Deschanel's pregnancy and maternity leave. Originally, six episodes were scheduled to air in 2011 before the series went on hiatus, but the sixth episode was postponed to January 12, 2012, with the series then going on hiatus until the spring. The season begins a few months after the end of the previous season with Brennan in her third trimester. The season also introduces a new recurring antagonist, whom executive producer Stephen Nathan describes as "more of a 21st-century, tech-savvy foe" compared to the series' past recurring antagonists. The first six episodes also deal with Booth and Brennan preparing to raise their child.

Crossovers with The Finder 
The Bones spin-off series The Finder, which aired its backdoor pilot episode as part of Bones sixth season, premiered on January 12, 2012. The Finder aired 7 of its 13-episode season in Bones time slot when it went on hiatus during January–March 2012, before The Finder moved to Fridays. Bones cast members John Francis Daley and T. J. Thyne, who portray Lance Sweets and Jack Hodgins, respectively, appeared in different episodes of The Finder. Also, David Boreanaz directed an episode of The Finder.

DVD and Blu-ray release 
The seventh season of Bones was released on DVD and Blu-ray in region 1 on October 9, 2012, in region 2 on October 1, 2012 and in region 4 on November 7, 2012. The set includes all 13 episodes of season seven on a 4-disc DVD set and 3-disc Blu-ray set presented in anamorphic widescreen. Special features include an audio commentary on "The Past in the Present" by Hart Hanson and Ian Toynton, deleted scenes from "The Memories in the Shallow Grave" and "The Past in the Present", a gag reel, and two featurettes—Creating "The Suit on the Set" and Bone of Contention: On the Red Carpet.

References 

General references

External links 
 
 

Season 07
2011 American television seasons
2012 American television seasons